Traymore was a station on the Reading Company's New Hope Branch. The station is currently on the line used by the New Hope and Ivyland Railroad. The station building itself was relocated from elsewhere on the North Pennsylvania Railroad.

References

Former Reading Company stations
Railway stations in the United States opened in 1891
Railway stations closed in 1952
Former railway stations in Bucks County, Pennsylvania